Al B. Henry (April 12, 1911 – July 26, 1989) was an American politician in the state of Washington. He served in the Washington House of Representatives on and off from 1941 to 1957 and in the Senate from 1957 to 1981. He was also the President pro tempore of the Senate from 1961 to 1963 and again from 1967 to 1981.

References

1989 deaths
1911 births
Democratic Party members of the Washington House of Representatives
20th-century American politicians
Democratic Party Washington (state) state senators